Jason Pelletier (born April 24, 1985 in Middletown, Pennsylvania) is a retired American soccer player who last played for Harrisburg City Islanders in the United Soccer League.

Career

College
Pelletier attended Middletown Area High School and played college soccer at Rutgers University and Robert Morris University. He was a staple in the central midfield for the Colonials, earning All-NEC selections in 2005 and 2006. He was also a Regional and National Olympic Development Program participant.

Professional
Pelletier turned professional in 2008 when he signed with the Harrisburg City Islanders of the USL Second Division and made his professional debut on April 26, 2008 in Harrisburg's 1-1 opening day tie with the Cleveland City Stars. He scored his first professional goal on May 3, 2008 in a 1–1 tie with the Pittsburgh Riverhounds. On February 2, 2010 Harrisburg City announced the re-signing of Pelletier for the 2010 season.

In February 2015, Pelletier announced his retirement from professional soccer prior to the 2015 season having made 141 appearances and scored 8 goals for the City Islanders.

Music career
Pelletier is currently in a production group with long-time friend and fellow producer Jason Miller. The duo are known as Goldman Stacks and Beat Street Productions, amongst others. The team's studio, known as the dojo, is located in the Oak Hills projects of Middletown, PA.

References

External links
Harrisburg City Islanders bio

1985 births
Living people
American soccer players
Penn FC players
USL Second Division players
USL Championship players
Robert Morris Colonials men's soccer players
Soccer players from Pennsylvania
People from Middletown, Pennsylvania
Association football midfielders